Grabarak is an uninhabited settlement in Croatia. 

Here was born Silvestar Bubanović, O.S.B.M. (1754 – 1810), the 3rd Greek-Catholic Bishop of Križevci

Ghost towns in Croatia